Connor Creek may refer to:

Connor Creek, Alberta, a locality
Connor Creek, Idaho, an unincorporated community in Cassia County